Oedebasis mutilata is a moth of the family Erebidae first described by Emilio Berio in 1966. It is known from eastern Madagascar.

The female of this species has a wingspan of 36 mm.

References

Moths described in 1966
Calpinae
Moths of Madagascar